Bricolage is construction using whatever was available at the time. The term Bricolage may also refer to:

 Bricolage (album), an album by Amon Tobin.
 Bricolage (software), a content management system.
 Mr. Bricolage, French hardware store
 Bricolage Production Company, theatre company

See also

 Brico (disambiguation)